Elazığ is a city in the Eastern Anatolia region of Turkey, and the administrative centre of Elazığ Province and Elazığ District. It is located in the uppermost Euphrates valley. Elazığ resembles an inland peninsula surrounded by the natural Lake Hazar and reservoirs of Keban Dam, Karakaya Dam, Kıralkızı and Özlüce. Its population is  443,363 (2021).

Name

Mezre
Elazığ was once a suburb of the ancient fortress town of Harpoot called Mezre. Heinrich Hübschmann believed Mezre to be the settlement of Mazara (Μαζάρα) mentioned by Ptolemy, while Nicholas Adontz derived the name from an Arabic word meaning arable land or hamlet (borrowed into Turkish as mezra, "hamlet"). Mezre may be a shortening of Ağavat Mezrası ("hamlet of the aghas/landlords"), explained by the fact that some notables from Harput had been exiled from the city and settled in nearby villages in the late 18th century.

Harpoot
Some Armenians from Harpoot are said to have settled on the site in 1617, so Elazığ was sometimes called Nor Kharberd ( 'New Harpoot') in Armenian.

Elazığ
With the creation of the Mamuret-ul-Aziz vilayet of the Ottoman Empire, the name Mamuret-ul-Aziz came into use as a name alternative for the city. This name quickly evolved into al-Aziz. In 1937, through an order from Mustafa Kemal Atatürk, this name was Turkified as Elazık, but due to difficulties in its pronunciation, it was finally accepted as Elazığ.

Demographics
In the early 20th century, the city was mainly inhabited by Turks and Armenians. The Armenian population grew rapidly in late 19th century and made up most or half of the population. The city also housed Assyrians and Zazas. The city currently has a mixed population of Zazas (northwestern Kurds) and Turks.

History

The town of Mezre (future Elazığ) was founded on the fertile plain below the hill on which the much older fortress and settlement of Harput was constructed. The Hurrians, who settled in this area in  2000 B.C., are the earliest known inhabitants of the area. Harput and its surrounding region was part of the kingdom of Urartu at its maximum extent, and the Urartians may have been the first to build a fortress here. Hakob Manandian believed it to have been the main fortress of the earlier Hayasa-Azzi confederation. It is possible that Harput stands on or is near the site of Carcathiocerta (more commonly identified with Eğil), the first capital of the Kingdom of Sophene. The early Muslim geographers knew Harput as Ḥiṣn Ziyād ("the fortress of Ziyād"), but the Armenian name, Khartabirt or Kharbirt, whence Kharput and Harput, was generally adopted in time.

Ottoman Harput and Mamûretü'l-Azîz
Harput and its vicinity fell under Turkish control in the year 1085 as a result of the Battle of Manzikert, which took place on August 26, 1071. The region around the fortress changed hands frequently in the subsequent centuries, coming under the control of the Çubukoğulları, Artuqids, Sultanate of Rum, Ilkhanate, Beylik of Dulkadir, Aq Qoyunlu, Safavids and Ottomans.

According to an official history written in 1883, Mezre was originally small hamlet in the vicinity of Harput which served as the official residence of the Çötelizades, one of the notable families exiled from Harput in the 1780s-90s. In 1834–36, the Çötelizades hosted the governor and military commander Reşid Mehmed Pasha, who turned the hamlet into a garrison for his campaigns in the eastern regions of the empire. In the 1850s and 60s, Mezre grew into a small town or suburb of Harput with a prosperous Armenian bourgeoisie. In 1869, an Armenian named Krikor Ipekjian (later Fabrikatorian) founded a silk factory in Mezre. In 1878, it was made the administrative centre of the Mamuret-ul-Aziz Vilayet (commonly referred to as the Harput Vilayet). According to census data from the 1880s, the population of Mezre consisted of 2,126 non-Muslim and 548 Muslim inhabitants, making it the only vilayet centre with an Armenian majority besides Van. Meanwhile, Harput proper had a population of 12,974 people (5,125 were non-Muslim and 7,849 Muslim). The populous villages on the plain below also had mixed Armenian-Muslim populations. The population of Mezre were mainly merchants, craftsmen and bureaucrats.

In 1892, the Armenian National Central Academy (Azgayin Kedronakan Varzharan) was founded in Mezre. By 1911, there was also an Armenian girls' school and a seminary, as well as two colleges run by French and German missionaries, among other educational institutions. There were four Armenian churches built in Mezre in the 19th (two Armenian Apostolic, one Catholic and one Protestant). Mezre, like Harput, also had a minority population of Syriac Christians. The building of the American consulate in Harput, established in 1901, was in fact located in Mezre.

Harput was an important station of the American missionaries for many years. The missionaries built Euphrates College, a theological seminary, and boys' and girls' schools. It operated until 1915 when its buildings were confiscated and used by the Ottoman Army as barracks. In November 1895, government-backed Turks and Kurds massacred, looted and burned the Armenian villages on the plain. In the same month, Harput was attacked and the American schools were burned down. During the Armenian genocide, many residents were killed.

Turkish Republican era

The town was captured by Kurdish rebels during the Sheikh Said rebellion against the government of Atatürk in 1925. It was used as a base of operations by the Turkish Army during the Dersim rebellion. During this time, the last Armenians of the region were expelled by the Turkish troops towards Armenia.

Elazığ was the seat of the Fourth Inspectorate-General from 1936 until 1952. The Inspectorate General included the provinces of Elazığ, Erzincan, Bingöl and Tunceli and was governed by a Governor Commander under military authority. He had wide-ranging power over the civilians and could order the application of capital punishment without the permission from the Turkish parliament. The office of the Governor Commander was eventually left vacant in 1948 but the legal framework for the Inspectorate-Generals was only abolished in 1952.

Elazığ rapidly developed into a modern city in the Republican era, while Harput was largely an abandoned ruin in the 1930s and 1940s. Efforts began in the 1950s to renovate the old town of Harput: some historic monuments were restored, a new municipality building was built and a museum was opened. Over time, Harput was turned into a suburb of Elazığ, and facilities were created for tourism and recreation. The ruined Armenian neighborhoods of Harput were levelled in the 1960s and the 1970s.

Ecclesiastical history
Harput has been the seat of a Syrian Orthodox bishop as early as the eleventh century, whose diocese was initially called Ḥiṣn Ziyād and later Harput. Unlike many Christian dioceses in Turkey, this one is still functioning even after the massacres that took place in the city during the Assyrian and Armenian genocides, in which the bishop and most of his flock were killed. The diocese has two priests, with the main church being based in the ancient Merymana Kilisesi next to the wall of the old fortress.

An Armenian Catholic diocese of Kharput was created in 1850 but was not re-established as a residential diocese after the Armenian genocide, only as an Armenian Catholic Titular see.

An Armenian Evangelical Church, built in the 19th century, survives as a ruined shell of its former self in the middle of a car park.

Economy

In the late 19th and early 20th century, Elazığ exported raisins, apricots and almonds to Europe. Opium was also grown in the area. Honey was also produced, but not so much exported, but used by locals. Gold was also found in the area in the early 20th century.

More than 30,000 people and at least 212 villages were affected by the construction of the Keban Dam in 1966–1974, which flooded several formerly populated areas. Many of those who were forced to move by the construction of the dam chose to settle in Elazığ and invested the indemnities paid to them by the state in houses in Elazığ or in small businesses. However, over 80% of families in zones affected by the Keban dam were landless peasants and thus ineligible to receive compensation or peasants with little land who would receive very little money (Koyunlu 1982: 250)

The dam, industry, and mining accounts for the high level of urbanization (42.7% in 1970) surpassing the average levels for Eastern Anatolia. The main agricultural activity of the area centers around vineyards and Elazığ also serves as a market hub for other agricultural products. The state-run vineyards of Elazığ are notable for its production of Buzbağ, a full-flavored red wine.

Today, Elazığ is the capital of the Elazığ Province. It is a busy city with a university and an industrial base, although historic monuments are scarce. The exception is the ancient citadel and town of Harput, a dependency of the greater municipality of Elazığ today situated three miles to the north of the city centre. Elazığ is the most developed city (and province) in the region, according to a report carried out by the Ministry of Development, making it the most developed region of Eastern Anatolia Region.

Geography
Elazığ is situated at the northwestern corner of a 30-mile-long valley, known locally as Uluova (literally the Great Valley). The area's Armenians called this valley "Vosgetashd" (the Golden Plain). Elazığ Province is surrounded by the Euphrates in the north, and since the completion of Keban Dam the rivers came to cover almost ten percent of the surface area of the province. Elazığ's adjacent province borders are with: Tunceli (North), Erzincan (North-West), Bingöl (East), Diyarbakır (South), and Malatya (West).

Subdivisions
The city of Elazığ is divided into 41 quarters: Hilalkent, Çaydaçıra, Ataşehir, Cumhuriyet, Çatalçeşme, Doğukent, Fevziçakmak, Gümüşkavak, Karşıyaka, Kırklar, Kızılay, Kültür, Nailbey, Rızaiye, Salibaba, Sanayi, Sürsürü, Ulukent, Yeni, Zafran, Alayaprak, Esentepe, Göllübağ, Harput Merkez, Sugözü, Izzetpaşa, Akpınar, Çarşı, Icadiye, Aksaray, Mustafapaşa, Olgunlar, Rüstempaşa, Sarayatik, Üniversite, Yıldızbağları, Abdullahpaşa, Hicret, Şahinkaya, Yemişlik and Güneykent.

Climate
Elazığ has a continental climate (Köppen climate classification: Dsa or Trewartha climate classification: Dca) with cold, snowy winters and hot, dry summers. However, due to the natural and artificial lakes around the city, some variation from this climate is experienced.

Cuisine
Elazığ cuisine is the second richest among all cities in Turkey with 154 different types of food and drinks according to a study conducted by Ankara Chamber of Commerce. Particularly those originated in the historic city of Harput have an important fame in the region and the country. Apart from famous meat platters most of which include meatballs, naturally dried fruits and vegetables and using them in main dishes are unique to Elazığ cuisine. Several examples could include: 
 Kofik dolma - stuffed dried peppers or aubergines
 Kelecoş - fried meat and onion served over a bed of flatbread pieces softened in yogurt
 İşkene - a breakfast soup containing broth and vegetables
 Harput köfte - meatballs made with a mixture of minced meat, cracked wheat, herbs and spices boiled in tomato sauce
 Taş Ekmeği - unleavened flatbread baked over hot stone or hotplate served with butter and jam
 Işkın yemeği - a wild rhubarb dish
 Sırın - pan-broiled handmade filo pastry roundels with a layer of yogurt and tomato sauce on top
 Kömme - baked handmade filo pastry roundels built with a layer of meat filling and a layer of walnut paste 
 Gaygana - a mixture of eggs, yogurt, bicarbonate, and flour drops fried in oil
 Orcik - walnut halves sewn in a thread, dipped into deep grape syrup
 Orcik şekeri - caramelised sugar coated walnut pieces

Elazığ is also known for its vineyards, and two types of grape varieties Öküzgözü and Boğazkere.

Transport
The airport is the 19th busiest airport in Turkey in terms of passenger traffic. There are daily domestic flights from/to Ankara, Istanbul and İzmir. During summer months there are some international flights from/to cities such as Düsseldorf and Frankfurt as well as from/to Antalya and Adana.

There are local companies provide coach service to almost all cities in Turkey. Ferryboat services are also present over the reservoir lakes to supplement highway connections to towns such as Ağın, and Pertek and Çemişgezek of Tunceli.

The Blue Train (passenger express) provides connection from Elazığ to Ankara.

Education
Elazığ is home to Fırat University, established in 1975 and since has become one of the leading academic institutions in the eastern Turkey.

Attractions

Fırat University
Harput Castle
Elazığ Culture Park
Elazığ Botanical Park
Elazığ Gazi Caddesi
Buzluk Mağarası (Ice Cave)
Museum of Archaeology and Ethnography
Hazar Gölü (Lake Hazar)

Hazarbaba Ski Centre
Historic mosques (Cami in Turkish), churches and shrines (Türbe in Turkish). Do note they are in Harput, on a hill out of town, but near enough to pay them a visit. 
 Ulu Camii: Built by Artuqid Sultan Fahrettin Karaaslan in 1156. It is one of the oldest and important structures in Anatolia
 Sarahatun Camii (also known as Sarayhatun Cami): Built by Sara Hatun, mother of Aq Qoyunlu (White Sheep Turkomans) Sultan Bahadır Han (also known as Uzun Hassan), in 1465 as a small mosque. It was renovated in 1585 and 1843.
 Kurşunlu Camii: Built between 1738 and 1739 in Harput during the Ottoman era.
 Alacalı Camii
 Ağa Camii: built in 1559.
 Arap Baba Mescidi ve Türbesi: Built during the reign of Seljuk Sultan Gıyaseddin Keyhüsrev III (son of Kılıçarslan IV) in 1279. The shrine contains a mummified body which is known as Arap Baba among commons.
 Fetih Ahmet Baba Türbesi (Shrine of Fetih Ahmed)
 Mansur Baba Türbesi
 Mary Church
 Sefik Gul Community Centre of Culture

Twin towns – sister cities

Elazığ is twinned with:
 Akmola Region, Kazakhstan
 Mamusha, Kosovo

Gallery

Notable people

References

Sources

Further reading

External links

 Municipality's official website
 Governor's official website

 
Assyrian communities in Turkey
Populated places established in 1834
Cities in Turkey